The Minister of Communications of Canada is a now-defunct cabinet post which existed from 1969 to 1996, when it was abolished.  Its telecommunications policy functions were transferred to the Minister of Industry and its cultural role was assumed by the  Minister of Canadian Heritage. 

The post was established by the Department of Communications Act, and abolished by the repeal of that act in 1995. During its existence, the department was authorized to oversee radio, television, and telephone communications in Canada, and supervised the CRTC.

Ministers of Communications
Key:

On July 12, 1996, office of the Minister of Communications and the office of the Minister of Multiculturalism and Citizenship were abolished and replaced with the office of Minister of Canadian Heritage (list).

Notes

Pat. Esso Bank of Canada Volunteers. 2017

See also
List of Canadian Ministers of Communications
 The repealed "Department of Communications Act"

Communications, Minister of